The Terrafirma Dyip is a professional basketball team playing in the Philippine Basketball Association (PBA). The team is owned by Terrafirma Realty Development Corporation and originally played under its affiliate company Columbian Autocar Corporation (under the Kia (Sorento, Carnival, Picanto), Mahindra (Enforcer, Floodbuster) and Columbian (Dyip) brands).

History

On April 10, 2014, Columbian Autocar Corporation, along with Manila North Tollways Corporation (NLEX Road Warriors) and Ever Bilena Cosmetics, Inc. (Blackwater Elite) were approved by the PBA Board of Governors to become expansion teams for the 2014–15 PBA season. Upon entry to the PBA, the three teams will select players from a dispersal draft in July consisting of unprotected current PBA players and free agents. They will also get to pick rookies in the 2014 PBA draft in August.
On June 9, 2014, the team held a press conference, announcing that boxer Manny Pacquiao will coach their team in the 2014–15 season. After announcing his intentions to join the draft, Pacquiao was picked 11th overall in the first round by the Kia team, thus becoming a playing coach.

Columbian Autocar Corporation (2014–2020)
A naming contest was held to determine the team's moniker or name. On August 24, 2014, hours after the 2014 PBA draft, Columbian Autocar Corporation president Ginia Domingo announced that they would take the moniker "Sorento", the name of their top-selling Kia sports utility vehicle in the Philippines and United States. Prior to obtaining its official moniker, the team was dubbed as "The Kia Kamao" which is a call back to Pacquiao's nickname "Pambansang Kamao".

Kia Sorento/Carnival (2014–15 season)
The Sorento marked their first win in franchise history after they defeated their fellow expansion team Blackwater Elite in the opening of the 2014–15 PBA season at the Philippine Arena. They lost their next ten games and finished 11th in the Philippine Cup.

For the 2015 Commissioner's Cup, the team changed its name to "Kia Carnival" to promote the introduction of the 2015 model of its namesake minivan. The team signed Puerto Rican player Peter John Ramos as their reinforcement.

In the 2015 Governors' Cup, the team selected Senegalese national team center Hamady N'diaye and Taiwanese stalwart Jet Chang as imports. The team created history by having the first Senegalese and Taiwanese imports in the league.

Mahindra Enforcer (2015–16 season)

On July 15, 2015, team managers Eric Pineda and Joe Ramos announced that the team will play the 2015–16 season as the "Mahindra Enforcer". The name change reflects the thrust of the company to introduce the Mahindra automobile brand.

Mahindra Enforcer became the first team in the PBA to have its own training facility, with the unveiling of "The Hardcourt" on March 12, 2016. The Hardcourt, which also contains a swimming pool, and a weights room, is located within the grounds of Azure Urban Resort and Residences in Bicutan, Parañaque. The facility will also have a basketball shooting machine.

For the 2016 Commissioner's Cup, the team signed the American player Augustus Gilchrist as their reinforcement

During the 2016 Governor's Cup, the Enforcers made their best start in their franchise history with 4–0 record. The franchise also made their first ever PBA playoff appearance but they lost to the Meralco Bolts in the quarterfinals.

Mahindra Floodbuster (2016–17 season)
On October 30, 2016, during the draft day, the team announced that the team will play 2016–17 season as the "Mahindra Floodbuster" to introduce the flood-proof variant of the Mahindra Enforcer, the Floodbuster.

Kia Picanto (2017–2018)
On July 6, 2017, seven days before the 2017 Governors' Cup, the team announced that the team will play as the "Kia Picanto" as part of a promotion to introduce a new vehicle model of the same name.

Columbian Dyip (2018–2020)

On April 3, 2018, the PBA announced that the team will play as the "Columbian Dyip" starting in the PBA Commissioner's Cup. This is the third brand to be used by the franchise, after Kia and Mahindra.

Terrafirma Realty franchise (2020–present)
On June 3, 2020, the PBA announced that it has approved Dyip's franchise owner Columbian Autocar Corporation to transfer its franchise to its affiliate company Terra Firma Realty Development Corporation. The name of the team was changed to "Terrafirma Dyip" under the new franchise owner.

In the 2020 Philippine Cup, the only conference of the 2020 season due to the COVID-19 pandemic, Terrafirma had a dismal 1–10 win–loss record.

Team roster

Head coaches

All-time roster

Season-by-season records

Records from the 2022–23 PBA season:

*one-game playoffs**team had the twice-to-beat advantage

See also
Terrafirma Dyip draft history

References

External links

 
2014 establishments in the Philippines
Basketball teams established in 2014